John Callen (born 4 November 1946) is an English-born New Zealand actor and director. He portrayed Óin, brother of Glóin in the 2012-2014 The Hobbit film trilogy.

Career 
He has performed in movies, including The Rainbow Warrior (as David Lange, the 32nd Prime Minister of New Zealand) and TV shows, as well as directing The Tribe, and lent his voice to Power Rangers Jungle Fury. He has performed in Goodbye Pork Pie, Pictures, Send a Gorilla, Feathers of Peace, Fly (Best Actor in a Short Film), Treasure Island Kids (x3), Love Birds in 2010 (with Sally Hawkins and Rhys Darby), and many TV series and films including Close to Home, Pioneer Women, Roche, Moynihan, 221B Baker Street, Xena – Amazon High (with Selma Blair and Karl Urban), The Man Who Lost His Head (with Martin Clunes), and Bliss (2010).

He has also directed many works for television including Shortland Street, The Tribe, Epitaph, Taonga, and The Kiwi Who Saved Britain (2010). Most recently he appeared in Love Knots and Good Grief series 2. He has performed in and/or directed more than 100 stage plays including performances as Macbeth, Shylock, Polonius and Claudius, and has won best actor and best supporting actor for his theatre work.

He has appeared in a number of TV adverts and voiced more than 150 documentaries and thousands of adverts. He recently won NZ Actors Equity Lifetime Achievement Award.

Filmography

Films

Television
Moynihan (1976) - Moynihan (Episode "You Can't Win 'Em All")
The Governor (1977) -  Private Landers (Episode "The Lame Seagull")
Inside Straight (1984) -  Bill (Episode "Episode #1.1")
Roche (1985) - Pat Donnelly (Episode "Cowboys")
Seekers (1986) - Bill Aspen / Bill (4 episodes)
Worzel Gummidge Down Under (1989) - Bailiff (Episode "Them Thar Hills")
The Rainbow Warrior (1993 TV Movie)
Amazon High (1997 TV Movie) - Oba 
Power Rangers Mystic Force (2006) - Mucor (voice) (Episode "Code Busters")
The Man Who Lost His Head (2007 TV Movie) - Nigel Harrison 
Power Rangers Jungle Fury (2008) - Sonimax (voice) (4 episodes)
Moe's Christmas (2017 TV Movie) - Santa 
Touch Wood (2019) - Grandpa Charlie (Episode "Thank You, Kind Sir")

Video GamesStar Wars: Knights of the Old Republic II - The Sith Lords (2004) - Zuka

YouTubeViva La Dirt League'' - Inspiring commander(2021)(Episode "Silent hero genius - Battle Plan"), Old mentor(2021) (Episode "Mentor"), Reader (2023) (Episode: "Being forced to read in video games")

References

External links
 

New Zealand male film actors
New Zealand male television actors
Living people
21st-century New Zealand male actors
English emigrants to New Zealand
New Zealand people of British descent
1946 births